Jan Koudelka (born 12 March 1992) is a professional Czech football player currently playing for FC Zbrojovka Brno.

References

External links
 Profile at Livesport
 Profile at Moravskoslezská fotbalová liga official site

Czech footballers
1992 births
Living people
Czech First League players
Czech National Football League players
FC Zbrojovka Brno players
People from Boskovice
Association football midfielders
Sportspeople from the South Moravian Region